Transport in Zagreb, the capital of Croatia, relies on a combination of city-managed mass transit and individual transportation. Mass transit is composed of 19 inner-city tram lines and 120 bus routes, both managed entirely by Zagrebački električni tramvaj. Croatian Railways manages the parallel Zagreb Commuter Rail system. The city is served by the Franjo Tuđman Airport, which carries more than 3,300,000 passengers per year.

Road transport

Zagreb drivers typically use a wide network of avenues and other arterial streets. Due to the shape of the city, most of the trips done in the city are on the east-west relation, causing high traffic on roads like Vukovar Avenue, Dubrovnik Avenue and Zagrebačka Avenue. The  Slavonska Avenue is the longest and one of the most congested roads in Zagreb, connecting the inner city to the A3 highway in the east.

Zagreb is a regional highway hub with eight highways and expressways radially leading into the city through the Zagreb bypass. Major highways and expressways include A1/A6, leading to Gorski Kotar, the Littoral and Dalmatia; A3 leading west to Rakitje, Samobor, Žumberak and Slovenia and east to Rugvica, Ivanić-Grad, Slavonia and Serbia; A2 leading northwest to Zaprešić, Zabok, Krapina and Central Europe; A4 leading northeast to Varaždin, Čakovec, Hungary and on to Eastern Europe; A11 leading southeast to Velika Gorica, Sisak and Petrinja (still in construction) and D10 leading east to Vrbovec and Križevci.

Similar to other European cities, Zagreb does not feature a regular grid plan. Donji Grad, the Zagreb downtown, mostly built in the 19th century, features a quasi-rectangular street plan, but the rest of the city depends on the form of wide straight avenues intersecting densely built neighborhoods composed of mostly chaotical street systems.

Taxicabs

The first taxicab ever in Zagreb started operating on June 11, 1901. It was driven by Tadija Bartolović, a skilled fiaker driver. After a successful test drive where Bartolović drove mayor Adolf Mošinsky through Mesnička Street and Gornji Grad, the first taxicab stand in the city was opened on the Ban Jelačić Square.

The association of taxicab drivers Radio Taksi Zagreb, of over 1,150 taxicabs, was the sole provider of taxi services in the city before 2011 when the first of many competitive services started to run taxicabs in the city.

Mass transit

Mass transit in Zagreb is managed by the company Zagrebački električni tramvaj (ZET), part of the Zagreb Holding, a holding managing utilities and other city services. ZET's trams used to span the entire city, but due to only two expansions (the Dubec and Prečko routes) in the last 20 years, trams are today confined to the inner city. However, a bus network supplements the tram and services a large part of the Zagreb metropolitan area even outside the borders of the city proper. Other transport amenities are also available, such as the Sljeme gondola lift (closed for re-construction since 2007) or the Zagreb Funicular.

Tram

The first tram line was opened on September 5, 1891, setting off a vital part of the Zagreb mass transit system. The network covers much of the inner city, but some lines extend to the suburbs, such as line 15 (operating in Podsljeme) or lines 7 and 11 (operating in Dubec).

The rolling stock is made up by various trams, including around 10 TMK 201 and around 50 ČKD-Tatra T4 remaining from 1970's (a few more may be stored and out of service for longer periods), 51 Tatra KT4, 16 TMK 2100 and 142 new, 100% low-floor TMK 2200 cars, of those 140 are 32 m standard version and only 2 shorter 21 m, with a further purchase planned. TMK 2200 is produced by the Crotram consortium, composed of Končar elektroindustrija and TŽV Gredelj, both from Zagreb.

Commuter rail

With 21 trains, the Zagreb suburban railway mainly covers the eastern and western parts of Zagreb. It mostly operates on the same standard-gauge lines used for Croatian Railways' long-distance trains. The trains normally operate on a 15-minute frequency, but reach only a portion of the city's suburbs.

Metro

A second light-rail or metro system, the Zagreb Metro, has been planned numerous times. It would complement the tram commuter rail networks, but currently, it is not even clear if the system would be a full metro or a light Metro.

The introduction to a mass rapid rail system has been analysed and presented in works in the period 1999-2001 after the finalization of the "Transport study of the city of Zagreb" that was co-financed by World Bank and the City of Zagreb with 1.0 million US$ in relation 50/50%. The first plans were presented in 2004, under which a light Metro would have been built, going at speeds of merely up to 35 km/h.

It has been stated that the full Metro is not worth building. A full metro would cost twice as much as the light metro, and could carry up to 70,000 people per hour in a direction. Forecasts predict that by 2020 the maximum load of passengers will be 7,000. It is worth noting, however, that the current tram network is used by around 200 million passengers every year, which would put the number of daily passengers at 50,000, a number which merits a high capacity rapid transit system.

The light metro's capacity would be 24,000, but due to the significantly cheaper cost, it was the preferred choice in January 2007, when the City Authorities announced plans for a new Metro System consisting of 4-5 metro lines. Phase 1 of the new metro was going to be 22.7 km long, of which 10 km would be underground. The Metro system will be based on the light rail PTN system currently in use in Vancouver, San Francisco or Singapore, but a full metro system is also a possibility.

There would be three lines running west–east, and two running north–south, converging on the city center. All lines were planned to go underground in the city center. Once the Zagreb metro system would be fully completed it would have 25 km of underground and 55 km overground lines. The cost of this entire system is thought to be about 5.5 billion Euro over 20 years. The initial cost would be between 600 million and 1,14 billion Euro.

A definitive public transport concept has yet to be decided upon, mostly due to funding issues caused by budgetary constraints. Premetro concept, Light rail concept (fully excluding expensive tunnel boring) on existing heavy rail corridors which need updating and some newly built, or full scale subway. There is no definitive starting point for construction works, with the project unlikely to start before the 2030s.

In September 2009, a plan for a light rail system was presented at the Croatian Chamber of Civil Engineers (HKIG) meeting by Dr. Davorin Kolić, a rail system designer with international experience.

Water transport

The river Sava flows through the city, but it is not navigable in Zagreb and the nearest port is located in Sisak. The city has had a history of flooding, and following the last catastrophic flood in 1964, when inundation affected  of inner-city territory, city authorities had built a system of levées to protect itself from Sava, together with a discharge canal Sava-Odra, completed in 1971. Since then the city's waterside has been strictly isolated, spanned only by three central bridges between the north of Zagreb and Novi Zagreb in the south. Later, seven more bridges were built in the west and the east, also over the levees.

References

External links

 Official site of the City of Zagreb
 Traffic section on the official site 
 Zagrebački električni tramvaj — ZET
 Croatian Railways
 Zagreb Bus Terminal
 Franjo Tuđman Airport